Panamic or Panamik is a village in the Leh district of Ladakh in India. It is located in the Nubra tehsil. Hot sulphur springs are found in the village.
Panamik is a contraction of  སྤང་ན་ཆུ་མིག་ 'Spang na Chumik', meaning 'the spring in the meadows'.

Demographics
According to the 2011 census of India, Panamic has 186 households. The effective literacy rate (i.e. the literacy rate of population excluding children aged 6 and below) is 80.44%.

References

Villages in Nubra tehsil